In 1935, the United States Navy Naval Research Laboratory began studies and tests on low visibility ship camouflage. Research continued through World War II to (1) reduce visibility by painting vertical surfaces to harmonize with the horizon and horizontal surfaces to blend with the sea, or (2) confuse identity and course by painting obtrusive patterns on vertical surfaces. Some camouflage methods served both purposes.  American captains were permitted less freedom of interpretation with these schemes (other than Measure 12 Modified) than their British Commonwealth counterparts applied to Admiralty camouflage schemes.

Early measures
With the likelihood of the United States entering the war, and after experiments with various paint schemes conducted in association with the 1940 Fleet Problem (exercise), the Bureau of Ships (BuShips) directed in January 1941 that the peacetime color of overall #5 Standard Navy Gray, a light gloss shade with a linseed oil base, be replaced with matte Dark Gray, #5-D, a new paint formulation with a synthetic alkyd resin base.  Rather than waste the large quantities of Standard Gray already in inventory and aboard ships, BuShips directed the issuance of a black tinting paste (5-BP) which when mixed in stated proportions with Standard Gray would yield a close approximation of 5-D, with issue of the new paint in pre-mixed form to follow. BuShips also issued Ship Camouflage Instructions (SHIPS-2), laying out 9 painting schemes to be used throughout the Navy. Rather than issue premixed quantities of the less-used new shades, Light Gray (5-L) and Ocean Gray (5-O), yards and supply depots were directed to issue an untinted base paint (5-U) together with a blue-black tinting material (5-TM) which when mixed according to instructions would turn 5-U into either Light or Ocean Gray.

The adoption of the new measures was very slow, however: as of late May the Navy's paint factories had yet  to receive the ingredients needed for the new alkyd-based paints and only in late April had they received even the lampblack required for conversion paste 5-BP.

By the summer of 1941 it had become apparent that Dark Gray (5-D) was unacceptably visible under all conditions, and the "conversion" 5-D made from prewar #5 was also too glossy and prone to chipping and peeling; meanwhile Pacific Fleet experiments with new colors Sea Blue and Sapphire Blue were deemed successful. Accordingly, in July–August Dark Gray was discontinued and new paint formulas Sea Blue (5-S) and Haze Gray (5-H) were implemented, together with Deck Blue (20-B) for all horizontals, steel and wood alike. The tinting paste was altered to contain somewhat less black and more blue than before; this meant that Ocean Gray also became somewhat more bluish in cast at this time and all the 5-series paint colors now were categorized as Munsell 5 Purple-Blue. Until 1945 all USN "gray" and almost all "blue" shades were produced using this same blue-black tint (5-TMa), so that the paints represented different tones of what was effectively a single blue-gray hue.

In September, Measures 1 through 8 were abolished and four new schemes promulgated in a revised edition of SHIPS-2. On 19 July Measure 12 had been prescribed for the entire Atlantic Fleet, and on 13 September Measure 11 for the Pacific. However, there was considerable time lag between the issuance of new instructions, and paint being manufactured and distributed and ships actually being repainted; at the time of the Pearl Harbor attack on December 7, 1941 most of the Pacific Fleet was still wearing dark gray Measure 1.

In November aircraft carriers began applying a dark blue-gray flight deck stain (#250) approximately the same color as Deck Blue, together with a stain approximately Ocean Gray for flight deck markings (#251). The Pacific Fleet's surface ships, less carriers, were ordered into Measure 11 on 16 December 1941. The order also substituted 5-N for 5-S 

Asiatic Fleet: The Asiatic Fleet, based in distant Manila, was unable to obtain the new paint colors and so in November painted its ships overall in a color procured from local sources midway between Sea Blue and Ocean Gray, dubbed "Cavite Blue."

Improved measures from combat experience

Within the first six months of combat, the United States Navy modified Measures 11 and 12 to meet the needs of Pacific Ocean operations. Sea Blue was found to be too light, and it was ordered replaced by new color Navy Blue (5-N), which used 50% more of the same tinting paste as Sea Blue and was correspondingly darker.

Tropic Green system: Through 1942 the Camouflage Section had issued no instructions for landing craft, PT boats, Tank Landing Ships (LSTs) and other vessels expected to operate close inshore in Pacific jungle conditions, so individual commands resorted to overall green, or ad-hoc camouflage patterns in whatever green or brown paints could be obtained. In early 1943 BuShips began the development a green series parallel to the blue-gray series, but the process was slow and therefore the South Pacific Command as an expedient ordered its amphibious vessels to be repainted in Dark Tropic Green with "tiger stripes" in Light Tropic Green, both of which could be created by mixing standard 5-TMa blue tinting medium with yellow zinc chromate primer. According to a contemporary report, "The color of the foliage [in the vicinity of Bougainville] was surprisingly high in key, a brilliance that would have been unbelievable except for the very same observations made on first arrival in the Solomons group."

Late wartime measures

The British Royal Navy established an Admiralty camouflage section in October 1940. Initial Admiralty disruptive camouflage schemes employed polygons of multiple shades of gray, blue and green so at least two of the colors would blend with background sea or sky under different light conditions. Experience showed the polygons were too small to be differentiated at effective camouflage ranges. Simplified Admiralty light and dark disruptive schemes were promulgated in 1942 to use larger and simpler polygons with no more than four colors.

Artist Everett Warner, who had headed the design section of Navy Camouflage during the First World War, returned to that post during the Second. On the basis of Warner's interpretations of recent Admiralty experience, BuShips issued a supplement to SHIPS-2 in March 1943 laying out multiple dazzle patterns under Measures 31 (dark), 32 (medium) and 33 (light) to conceal identity and confuse submarine torpedo fire control. Each measure included multiple pattern designs for ship classes so the pattern would not identify the class of ship. These measures represent the final evolution of dazzle camouflage.

Warner's office issued over 300 pattern sheets for Measures 31-33. Specific patterns in the dazzle measures were designated as, e.g., MS-32/3D, meaning the 3rd Destroyer pattern under Measure 32; an A indicated an aircraft carrier pattern, B for battleships, C for cruisers and so on. Often a pattern designed for one ship type would be adapted to another, so that, for example, the battleship  wore an adaptation of Measure 32/18D, originally a destroyer pattern. Some patterns could be used as Measure 31, 32 or 33 depending on the paints chosen; these were listed as, e.g.,  MS-3_/6D.

On 15 September 1943 the South Pacific command adopted the dazzle measures for all ships; in October the Pacific Fleet officially adopted the dazzle measures for most of its remaining ships.

In January 1945 BuShips revised its paint formulations due to a shortage of blue pigment, and the realization that tone was far more important than hue in camouflage effect, eliminating the blue-purple shades which had characterized nearly all Navy ship colors whether called "blue" or "gray."  The new paints were neutral grays, Navy Gray replacing Navy Blue (but confusingly receiving the designation "5-N" while Navy Blue became "5-NB"), and Deck Gray replacing Deck Blue. Ocean Gray and Haze Gray retained their names but lost their bluish cast. However, the new paints (which were shipped pre-mixed, not as tinting paste) were generally only available in stateside yards, while ships repainted at forward bases continued to use the older bluish colors. Moreover, for Measure 22 (but not 12 or 21), Navy Blue was still prescribed until existing stocks were exhausted.

In February the Pacific Fleet, deciding that the primary threat to its ships was now kamikaze, directed that all ships be repainted in Measure 12, 21 or 22, and dazzle schemes began to disappear again. All auxiliaries and odd-numbered cruiser divisions, destroyer squadrons and destroyer-escort divisions were to be painted in Measure 21, and all even-numbered CA/CL divisions, DD squadrons and DE divisions in Measure 22. Ironically, the Atlantic Fleet did not get the memo, and during 1945 ships scheduled for Pacific transfer were repainted in dazzle, only to be painted again in Measure 21 or 22 on arrival at the West Coast or Hawaii.

US Navy ship camouflage paints

* Not a specification; measured by the US Bureau of Standards in October 1941
** Not a specification; estimated 
*** In other words, paint issued by BY&D for shore facilities and their equipment, procured by Amphibious Force crews during mid to late 1942

Notes

References

Bibliography

Independent sources

Primary sources

 
 
 
 

World War II ships of the United States
Military camouflage
Camouflage patterns
Vehicle markings